The Triumph of Robin Hood (Italian: Il trionfo di Robin Hood) is a 1962 Italian adventure film directed by Umberto Lenzi  and starring Don Burnett, Gia Scala and Samson Burke.

The film's sets were designed by the art director Giuseppe Ranieri. It was shot on location in Slovenia and Croatia.

Plot
While King Richard continues his campaign in the Holy Land, his most loyal subjects back in England are led by Robin Hood. Together, Richard's subjects unite to gallantly resist against Baron Elwin, the Sheriff of Nottingham who seeks to enhance his standing with Prince John.

Cast
 Don Burnett as Robin Hood 
 Gia Scala as Anna 
 Samson Burke as Little John 
 Vincenzo Musolino as William Gamwell 
 Gaia Germani as Isabella 
 Arturo Dominici as Baron Elwin, Sheriff of Nottingham 
 Enrico Luzi as Scully 
 Daniela Igliozzi as Madeleine 
 Vinicio Sofia as Sir Tristan of Goldsborough 
 Gianni Solaro as Sir Goodman 
 Maks Furijan as Sir Guy 
 Nello Pazzafini as Black Peter 
 Janez Vrhovec as John Lackland

References

Bibliography 
 Roy Kinnard & Tony Crnkovich. Italian Sword and Sandal Films, 1908–1990. McFarland, 2017.

External links 
 

1962 films
1960s historical adventure films
Italian historical adventure films
1960s Italian-language films
Films directed by Umberto Lenzi 
Films set in Nottingham
Films set in England
Robin Hood films
1960s Italian films